The "I AM" Activity Movement is the original ascended master teachings religious movement founded in the early 1930s by Guy Ballard (1878–1939) and his wife Edna Anne Wheeler Ballard (1886–1971) in Chicago, Illinois. It is an offshoot of theosophy and a major precursor of several New Age religions including the Church Universal and Triumphant. The movement had up to a million followers in 1938 and is still active today on a smaller scale. According to the official website of the parent organization, the Saint Germain Foundation, its worldwide headquarters is located in Schaumburg, Illinois, and there are approximately 300 local groups worldwide under several variations of the names "I AM" Sanctuary, "I AM" Temple, and other similar titles. As of 2007, the organization states that its purpose is "spiritual, educational and practical," and that no admission fee is charged for their activities. The term "I AM" is a reference to the ancient Sanskrit mantra So Ham and the divine biblical name "I Am that I Am".

Overview
The movement believes in the existence of a group called the "ascended masters," a hierarchy of supernatural beings that includes the original theosophical masters such as Jesus Christ, El Morya Khan, Maitreya, and in addition several dozen more beyond the original 20 Masters of the Ancient Wisdom of the original theosophists as described by Helena Petrovna Blavatsky.

These ascended masters are believed to be humans who have lived in a succession of reincarnations in physical bodies or cosmic beings (beings originated from the great central sun of light in the beginning of all times). Over time, those who have passed through various “embodiments” became highly advanced souls, are able to move beyond the cycles of "re-embodiments" and karma, and attained their "ascension", becoming immortal. Ascended masters are believed to communicate to humanity through certain trained messengers per Blavatsky, including Guy and Edna Ballard. Because Jesus is believed to be one of the ascended masters, making the "Christ Light" available to seekers who wish to move out of darkness, many of the members of the "I AM" Activity consider it to be a Christian religion. According to the Los Angeles Magazine, Ballard said he was the re-embodiment of George Washington, an Egyptian priest, and a noted French musician.

The "I AM" Activity was the continuation of the teachings received by Helena Blavatsky and William Quan Judge. Ballard was always guided and inspired by the writings of William Quan Judge (1851-1896), who used the pseudonym David Lloyd due to the persecution of his enemies in the Theosophical Society. Ballard later came into contact with the ascended master Saint Germain.

Ballard died in 1939. In 1942, his wife and son were convicted of fraud, a conviction which was overturned in a landmark Supreme Court decision (United States v. Ballard), ruling that the question of whether the Ballards believed their religious claims should not have been submitted to a jury. This event has been known as the determinant for the establishment of the policies regarding freedom of religion or beliefs rights in the United States of America.

History

Founding 
The "I AM" Activity was founded by Guy Ballard (pseudonym Godfré Ray King) in the early 1930s. Ballard was well-read in theosophy and its offshoots, and while hiking on Mount Shasta looking for a rumored branch of the Great White Brotherhood known as "The Brotherhood of Mount Shasta", he claimed to have met and been instructed by a man who introduced himself as "Saint Germain." Saint Germain is regular component of theosophical religions as an ascended master, based on the historical Comte de Saint-Germain, an 18th-century adventurer.

The Ballards said they began talking to the ascended masters regularly. They founded a publishing house, Saint Germain Press, to publish their books and began training people to spread their messages across the United States. These training sessions and "conclaves" were held throughout the United States, open to the general public and free of charge. A front-page story in a 1938 edition of the Chicago Herald and Examiner noted that the Ballards "do not take up collections or ask for funds". Some of the original members of I AM were recruited from the ranks of William Dudley Pelley’s organization the Silver Shirts. Meetings became limited to members only after hecklers began disrupting their open meetings. Over their lifetimes, the Ballards recorded nearly 4000 live dictations, which they said were from the ascended masters. Guy Ballard, his wife Edna, and later their son Donald, became the sole "accredited messengers" of the ascended masters. In 1942, they began the I AM Sanctuary at a former Presbyterian missionary school.

Popularity 
The Ballards' popularity spread, including up to a million followers in 1938. They accepted donations (called "love gifts") from their followers across the country, though no such donation or dues were required.

The first of many "conclaves" held in scores of cities in their national tours was Philadelphia, Pennsylvania, October 10–19, 1934. According to a Los Angeles Magazine article, in August 1935, the Ballards hosted a gathering at the Shrine Auditorium in Los Angeles that drew a crowd of 6,000. Guy Ballard spoke under the pseudonym he used in authoring his books, Godfre Ray King, and his wife used the pseudonym Lotus. The meeting included teachings they described as being received directly from the ascended masters. They led the audience in prayers and affirmations that they called decrees, including adorations to God and invocations for abundance of every good thing, including love, money, peace, and happiness.

Guy Ballard's death 
At the height of his popularity, Guy Ballard died from arteriosclerosis at 5:00 A.M. on December 29, 1939, in Los Angeles, in the home of his son Donald. On December 31 his body was cremated. On New Year's Day during the annual Christmas Class, Edna Ballard stated that Guy had completed his Ascension at midnight December 31, 1939, from the "Royal Teton Retreat".

Students of the "I Am" Activity believe in death as a change, not an ending. The "I AM" activity believe "ascension" can mean entering heaven alive, that is, to "raise one's body"—physically translating to a higher form of existence, as in the ascension of Jesus. This is what Guy Ballard had claimed his followers would be able to do if they followed his instructions. Recorded in a dictation prior to Guy W Ballard's death a new dispensation to make the ascension after the passing of death and cremation was given, and is recorded at the Saint Germain Foundation. Students using this more traditional definition would have to conclude that Mrs. Ballard did not tell the full teaching, since Mr. Ballard had died a quite ordinary death and his body had been cremated. There had also been questions raised about devout members who had died without entering heaven alive. At this time, Edna Ballard defined "ascension" as dying an ordinary death, but going to a higher level of heaven than a normal person because one has balanced "51% of one's karma". This modified and more practical definition of "ascension" is used by all ascended master teachings religions today, although they still believe that a select few, higher-level ascended masters such as Jesus and St. Germain entered heaven alive.

Copyright infringement civil action 
In 1941, the Ballards were sued for copyright infringement by the family and estate of Frederick Spencer Oliver (1866-1899), "amenuensis" of the novel A Dweller on Two Planets, first published in 1905. The suit was dismissed for failure to state cause of action. District Judge Dawkins quoted the original foreword to Oliver's book in its entirety, wherein Oliver emphasized that he was not the author but had channeled the book from the spirit of a previously deceased person with the intent of preserving and conveying the story and teachings of that person's world; and the book had been copyrighted with Oliver as a proprietor, not as the author. Judge Dawkins pointed out that the Ballards had stated they were using similar methods to write their books and that this in itself wasn't enough to uphold the action in court.

Fraud trial of Edna and Donald Ballard 
Based on statements made in books sent via the mail, Edna Ballard and her son Donald were charged with eighteen counts of mail fraud in 1942. The presiding judge instructed the jury not to consider the truth or falsity of the religious beliefs, but only whether the Ballards sincerely believed the claims or did not, and the jury found them guilty. The Ninth Circuit overturned the conviction on the grounds that the judge improperly excluded the credibility of their religious beliefs from consideration, and the government appealed to the Supreme Court. In United States v. Ballard, the Supreme Court in a 5-4 landmark decision held that the question of whether Ballards believed their religious claims should not have been submitted to the jury, and remanded the case back to the Ninth Circuit, which affirmed the fraud conviction. Interpreting this decision, the Ninth Circuit later found that the Court did not go so far as to hold that "the validity or veracity of a religious doctrine cannot be inquired into by a Federal Court."

On a second appeal, the Supreme Court in 1946 vacated the fraud conviction, on the grounds that women were improperly excluded from the jury panel.

Relocation to Santa Fe and Edna Ballard's death 
In March 1942, Edna Ballard moved the western branch of the Saint Germain Press and her residence to Santa Fe, where she recorded live before an audience thousands more dictations she said were from the Ascended Masters.

Despite the ultimate dismissal of the court cases, it was not until 1954 that the organization's right to use the mail was restored. The Internal Revenue Service revoked their tax-exempt status in 1941, stating it did not recognize the movement as "a religion". A court ruling in 1957 overturned the ruling of the IRS and re-established the group's tax-exempt status.

Edna Ballard's death following "a brief illness" was reported as having occurred in her Chicago home on February 10, 1971.

Recent history and present day 
As of 2007, Saint Germain Foundation maintains a reading room in Mount Shasta, California, and its headquarters in Schaumburg, Illinois. Several annual conclaves are held at their 12-story "I AM Temple" at 176 West Washington Street in downtown Chicago. Among the hundreds attending, there are usually dozens of "I AM" students from other nations. Classes and conclaves are regularly held in approximately 300 locations in America, Europe, Latin America, Australia, and Africa. The Saint Germain Press, a subsidiary of the Saint Germain Foundation, publishes the historical books and related artwork and audio recordings of the Ballards' teachings, and a monthly magazine available by subscription, titled "The Voice of the 'I AM'". It has been estimated that the Saint Germain Press has printed and put into circulation over one million books.

The Saint Germain Foundation presents the "I AM" COME! Pageant every August at Mount Shasta, and has done so each year since 1950. Their website states that the performance is open to the public at no cost, and describes the pageant as a portrayal of "the life of Beloved Jesus, focusing on His Miracles of Truth and Healing, and the example of the Ascension which He left to the world."

Teachings 
According to the group's teachings, ascended masters are believed to be individuals who have left the reincarnation cycle of re-embodiment.

The "I AM" Activity calls itself Christian, because Jesus is considered to be one of the more important ascended masters. It also refers to itself as patriotic because ascended master St. Germain is believed to have inspired and guided the USA Declaration of Independence and the Constitution. Followers claim that St. Germain belonged to the same Masonic Lodge as George Washington and Benjamin Franklin. However, Guy Ballard tended to downplay any relation of his ideas to Freemasonry because of his great discordance with Franklin Delano Roosevelt, a famous Freemason. Thus the notion that Saint-Germain belonged to a Masonic Lodge was more part of general occult lore than part of Ballard's emphasis.

The movement teaches that the omnipotent, omniscient and omnipresent creator God ('I AM' – Exodus 3:14) is in all of us as a spark from the Divine Flame, and that we can experience this presence, love, power and light – and its power of the Violet Consuming Flame of Divine Love – through quiet contemplation and by repeating 'affirmations' and 'decrees'. By affirming something one desires, one may cause it to happen.

The group teaches that the "Mighty I AM Presence" is God existing in and as each person's higher self, and that a light known as the "violet flame" is generated by the "I AM Presence" and may surround each person who calls forth the action of the holy spirit for expression of mercy or forgiveness. The group believes that by tapping into these internalized powers in accordance with the teachings of the ascended masters, one can use one's relationship to the "presence" to amplify the expressions of virtue such as justice, peace, harmony, and love; to displace or abate the expression of evil (relative absence of good) in the world; and to minimize personal difficulties in one's life.

The spiritual goal of the teachings is that, through a process of self-purification, the believer may attain the perfected condition of the saints, or become an ascended master when leaving their body, contrasted to common concepts of 'ordinary death'. The process of attaining these results includes one or another of interior practices to facilitate resonance and alignment with the "I AM Presence": self-assessment in light of saintly exemplars such as Jesus, care in the use of language, devotion (to the Divine), gratitude, meditation, invocations and affirmations; and external practices such as "decrees" (repeated prayers given aloud with conviction), all of which are said to amplify the energetic presence of the divine in one's experience, resulting in the desired positive changes. Members believe there is actual science behind decrees and affirmations and claim these practices are acknowledged by medicine as effective.

The group also emphasizes personal freedom as essential to spiritual development.

These "positive thinking" beliefs overlap with several movements, such as New Thought, the so-called New Age movement and the Human Potential Movement.

See also
 Exaltation (LDS Church) 
 Robert LeFevre
 Mirra Alfassa
 Supermind (integral yoga)

References

Partial bibliography
 Saint Germain Foundation. The History of the "I AM" Activity and Saint Germain Foundation. Saint Germain Press 2003 
 King, Godfre Ray. Unveiled Mysteries. Saint Germain Press. 
 King, Godfre Ray. The Magic Presence. Saint Germain Press. 
 Saint Germain. I AM Discourses. Saint Germain Press. 
 Peter Mt. Shasta. "Lady Master Pearl, My Teacher." Church of the Seven Rays.

External links 
 Information on the website of the Saint Germain Foundation , original publisher of Ascended Master Teachings beginning in 1934.
 Unveiled Mysteries, full text of Guy Ballard's first book, available online at no cost
 Psychic Dictatorship in America, a collection of a series of monographs or chapters by a former member, Gerald Bryan.
 Publications of the FBI Case BALLARD, EDNA ANNE processed and released pursuant to the Freedom of Information Act (FOIA), a Document with all published pages of this case.
 Release 1 of the Publications of the FBI Case BALLARD, GUY WARREN processed and released pursuant to the Freedom of Information Act (FOIA), a Document with all published pages of this case.
 Release 2 of the Publications of the FBI Case BALLARD, GUY WARREN processed and released pursuant to the Freedom of Information Act (FOIA), a Document with all published pages of this case.

Ascended Master Teachings
New Age
Religious belief systems founded in the United States